This is the list of notable stars in the constellation Columba, sorted by decreasing brightness.

Notes

See also 
 List of stars by constellation

References 
 
 
 
 

List
Columba